Cátia Halar (born November 28, 1982) is a Mozambican female professional basketball player.

External links
Profile at fiba.com
Profile at afrobasket.com

References

1982 births
Living people
Sportspeople from Maputo
Mozambican women's basketball players
Power forwards (basketball)
Small forwards